Happy Feet is a 2006 computer-animated family film.

Happy Feet may also refer to:

 Happy Feet (video game), a 2006 action-adventure game
 Happy Feet (Emilie-Claire Barlow album), 2003
 Happy Feet, an album by 8½ Souvenirs
 "Happy Feet", a song by Quincy Jones from the Walk, Don't Run soundtrack
 "Happy Feet", a song from the 1930 film King of Jazz
 Happy Feet: The Savoy Ballroom Lindy Hoppers and Me, a children's book by Richard Michelson

See also 
 Happy Feet Two, the 2011 sequel to the 2006 film